Mexicana is a genus of monogeneans belonging to the family Ancyrocephalidae. 
All members of the genus are parasitic on fish.

Species
The following species are considered valid according to WorRMS: 
 Mexicana anisotremum Cezar, Paschoal & Luque, 2012 
 Mexicana atlantica Luque, Amato & Takemoto, 1992
 Mexicana bychowskyi Caballero & Bravo-Hollis, 1959 
 Mexicana iannaconi Chero, Cruces, Sáez & Alvariño, 2014 
 Mexicana littoralis Caballero & Bravo-Hollis, 1959
For the distribution of Mexicana bychowskyi, see Mendoza-Garfias et al. (2017).

References

Ancyrocephalidae
Monogenea genera